New Market Battlefield State Historical Park is a historic American Civil War battlefield and national historic district located near New Market, Shenandoah County, Virginia. The district encompasses the site of the Battle of New Market, a battle fought on May 15, 1864, during Valley Campaigns of 1864. In the middle of the battlefield  stands the Bushong House, used by both sides as a hospital during the battle and now the visitor center for the 300-acre park.

The park is the site of the Virginia Museum of the Civil War operated by the Virginia Military Institute.

It was listed on the National Register of Historic Places in 1970.

References

External links
 Virginia Museum of the Civil War - official site

Battle of New Market
Parks in Shenandoah County, Virginia
American Civil War museums in Virginia
Museums in Shenandoah County, Virginia
Open-air museums in Virginia
Buildings and structures in Shenandoah County, Virginia
American Civil War on the National Register of Historic Places
Conflict sites on the National Register of Historic Places in Virginia
Historic districts on the National Register of Historic Places in Virginia
National Register of Historic Places in Shenandoah County, Virginia
Battlefields of the Eastern Theater of the American Civil War
Shenandoah County in the American Civil War